James is a surname in the English language originating from the given name, itself derived from the HebrewYaʿaqōḇ. Notable people with the surname include:

A
 A. P. T. James (c. 1908–1962), better known as 'Fargo' James; Tobagonian politician
 Aaron James (basketball) (born 1952), American basketball player
 Aaron James (footballer) (born 1976), Australian rules footballer from Victoria
 Ada James (1876–1952), American suffragist and reformer
 Adam James (actor) (born 1972), British actor
 Adam James (singer), Australian country singer
 Aidan James (born 2001), American singer and musician
 Alan James (1890–1952), American film director and screenwriter
 Alan James (poet), South African poet
 Alec James (cricketer) (1889–1961), Welsh cricketer
 Aled James (born 1982), Welsh rugby union footballer
 Alex James (footballer) (1901–1953), Scottish soccer player
 Alex James (musician) (born 1968), English musician and journalist, member of band Blur
 Alex James (songwriter) (born 1976), songwriter and producer
 Alice James (1848–1892), American diarist
 Andre James (born 1997), American football player
 Andrea James (born 1967), American writer, film producer, director and LGBT rights activist
 Andrea James (playwright), Australian playwright, author of Sunshine Super Girl
 Angela James (born 1964), Canadian ice hockey player
 Angharad James (poet) (1677–1749), Welsh language poet
 Ann James (born 1952), Australian illustrator and writer
 Ann James (artist) (1925 – 2011), English-born Canadian artist and educator
 Annie Laurie Wilson James (1862–?), American journalist
 Anthony James (actor) (1942–2020), American actor
 Anthony James (artist) (born 1974), English sculptor, painter and performance artist
 Antonio James (c. 1954–1996), American murderer
 Antonio D. James (born 1985), American film director
 Antony James (born 1989), British swimmer
 Archibald James (1893–1980), British politician and Royal Air Force officer
 Arnold James (born 1974), international footballer from Antigua and Barbuda 
 Art and Arthur James (disambiguation), multiple people
 Art James (1929–2004), American game show host
 Art James (baseball), American baseball player
 Arthur James (racehorse owner) (1853–1917), British racehorse owner
 Arthur James (footballer) (1855–1911), English footballer
 Arthur James (politician) (1883–1973), Governor of Pennsylvania
 Arthur Lorne James (1903–1964), Air Vice-Marshal in the Royal Canadian Air Force
 Arthur G. James (1912–2001), American surgeon
 Arthur James (judge) (1916–1976), English Court of Appeal judge
Ashley James (curator), American curator
 Augustus James (1866–1934), Australian politician
 Aurora James (born 1984), Canadian creative director, activist, and fashion designer

B
 Barbara James (1943–2003), Australian author, historian, journalist, political adviser and activist
 Barry James, English stage actor
 Becky James (born 1991), Welsh cyclist
 Benjamin James (disambiguation), multiple people
 Benjamin James (Nova Scotia politician), farmer and political figure in Nova Scotia
 Benjamin F. James (1885–1961), Republican member of the U.S. House of Representatives from Pennsylvania
 Benjamin James (American football), head football coach for the Dickinson College Red Devils, 1942
 Benjamin James (Nova Scotia politician), farmer and political figure in Nova Scotia
 Bernard James (born 1985), American basketball player
 Bernie James (baseball) (1905–1994), American baseball player
 Bernie James (born 1958), English–born, American soccer player
 Bert James (disambiguation), multiple people
 Bert James (baseball) (1886–1959), American baseball player
 Bert James (1914–2006), Australian politician
 Betty James (1918–2008), American businesswoman who named the slinky
 Bill James (disambiguation), multiple people
 Bill James (pitcher, born 1887) (1887–1942), baseball player
 Bill James (pitcher, born 1892) (1892–1971), baseball player
 Bill James (novelist) (born 1929), novelist
 Bill James (American politician) (born 1930), American politician
 Bill James (rower), New Zealand rower
 Bill James (Australian footballer) (born 1937), Australian rules footballer
 Bill James (born 1949), American baseball writer and historian
 Billy James (disambiguation), multiple people
 Billy T. James (1948–1991), New Zealand comedian
 Billy James (basketball) (born 1950), American professional basketball player
 Billy James (rugby player) (born 1956), Welsh rugby union player
 Billy James (born 1960), American publicist, musician, and author known as Ant-Bee
 Billy James (publicist), American publicist and talent scout
 Bob James (disambiguation), multiple people
 Bob James (musician) (born 1939), jazz musician
 Bob James (rock singer) (1952–2021), singer of Montrose, 1974–1976
 Bob James (baseball) (born 1958), baseball player for the Expos, Tigers, and White Sox
 Bob James (country singer) (born 1960), representative of CMT Europe, 1995–1997
 Brad James (born 1981), American actor
 Bradley James (disambiguation), multiple people
 Bradley James, English actor
 Bradley James (1961–2012), American professional wrestler better known as Brad Armstrong
 Brandon James (born 1987), American footballer
 Brendan James (born 1979), American singer/songwriter
 Brett James (footballer) (born 1972), Australian Rules footballer from South Australia
 Brett James (born 1968), American singer, songwriter and record producer
 Brian James (disambiguation), multiple people
 Brian James (actor) (1918–2009), Australian TV actor
 Brian James (cricketer, born 1934) (1934–2000), English cricketer
 Brian James (cricketer, born 1941) (1941–2002), English cricketer
 Brian James (rugby league) (1943–2020), Australian rugby league footballer
 Brian James (guitarist) (born 1955), British punk musician, former member of The Damned
 Brian James (basketball) (born 1956), American basketball coach
 Brian d'Arcy James (born 1968), American actor and musician
 Brian Girard James, better known as Road Dogg (born 1969), American professional wrestler
 Brian R. James (born 1974), American game designer and software engineer
 Brion James (1945–1999), American character actor
 Bronny James (born 2004), American basketball player and son of LeBron James
 Butch James (born 1979), South African rugby player

C
 C. L. R. James (1901–1989), Trinidadian essayist and historian of the Haitian Revolution
 Carl James (1925–2005), American collegiate sports executive
 Carlos James (born 1971), American college baseball coach
 Carol James, New Zealand footballer
 Carol-Ann James, West Indian cricketer
 Carole James (born 1957), Canadian politician
 Carwyn James (1929–1983), Welsh rugby player
 Casey James (born 1982), American singer and guitarist
 Cecil James (1913–1999), English bassoonist
 Cedric James (born 1979), American footballer
Charlene James, British playwright and screenwriter
 Charles and Charlie James (disambiguation), multiple people
 Charles Tillinghast James (1805–1862), U.S. Senator from Rhode Island
 Charles James (MP) (1817–1890), British politician
 Charles Hamilton James, Count of Arran, Anglo-Scottish Soldier and Author
 Charles Pinckney James (1818–1899), U.S. federal judge
 Charles James (chemist) (1880–1928), British–born discoverer of lutetium
 Charles James (footballer) (1882–1960), English footballer for Stoke
 Charles James (rugby league) (1891–1917), New Zealand rugby league footballer
 Charles Holloway James (1893–1953), British architect
 Charles James (designer) (1906–1978), British–American fashion designer
 Charles James (attorney) (born 1954), U.S. assistant attorney general
 Charles James (American football) (born 1990), American football cornerback
 Charlie James (baseball) (born 1937), American baseball player
 Chris James (baseball) (born 1962), American baseball player
 Chris James (racing driver) (born 1978), British auto racing driver and businessman
 Chris James (footballer) (born 1987), New Zealand soccer player
 Christine James, Welsh poet and academic; Archdruid of Wales
 Christopher James, 5th Baron Northbourne (1926–2019), British farmer and aristocrat
 Christopher James (poet) (born 1975), British poet
 Ciaran James (born 1991), British water polo player
 Chuck James (born 1981), American baseball player
 Clement James (footballer) (born 1981), British footballer
 Cleo James (born 1940), American baseball player
 Clifton James (1921–2017), American actor
 Clive James (1939–2019), Australian writer, poet, essayist, critic, and commentator on popular culture
 Colin James (bishop) (1926–2009), Bishop of Wakefield, 1977–1985, and Winchester, 1985–1995
 Colin James (journalist) (born 1944), New Zealand journalist
 Colin James (born 1964), Canadian musician
 Connor James (born 1982), Canadian ice hockey player
 Connor James (soccer) (born 1996), Canadian soccer player
 Cordelia James, Baroness James of Rusholme (1912–2007), British educator and justice of the peace
 Craig James (disambiguation), multiple people
 Craig T. James (born 1941), U.S. Representative from Florida
 Craig James (running back) (born 1961), American football player and sportscaster
 Craig James (economist) (born 1962), Australian economist
 Craig James (English footballer) (born 1982), English footballer

D
 Dafydd James (born 1975), Welsh rugby union international and British Lion
 Dai James (1899–after 1929), Welsh forward
 Dan and Daniel James (disambiguation), multiple people
 Dan James (1937–1987), American footballer
 Daniel James (businessman) (1801–1876), one of the co-founders of Phelps, Dodge & Co.
 Daniel Willis James (1832–1907), American businessman
 Daniel James (Gwyrosydd) aka "Gwyrosydd" (1848–1920), Welsh poet and hymn-writer
 Daniel Lewis James (1911–1988), American author
 Daniel James, Jr. aka "Chappie" (1920–1978), African American USAF general
 Daniel James (historian) (born 1948), British historian and expert in Peronism
 Daniel James (soldier) (born 1962), British Army Corporal and interpreter, convicted of espionage
 Daniel James (game developer) (born 1971), British-Canadian video game developer
 Daniel James (music producer) (born 1975), Australian music producer and songwriter
 Daniel James (footballer) (born 1997), Welsh soccer player
 Darren James (broadcaster) (born 1960), Australian radio broadcaster
 Darren James (born 1964), American pornographic actor
 David James (disambiguation)
 David James (actor, born 1839) (1839–1893), English comic actor and one of the founders of London's Vaudeville Theatre
 David James (actor, born 1967) (born 1967), Australian television and film actor; and former presenter of ABC's Play School
 David James (actor, born 1972) (born 1972), South African film, theater, and television actor known for playing Koobus Venter in the 2009 film District 9
 David James (bishop) (born 1945), current bishop of Bradford
 David James (cell biologist) (born 1958), cell biologist who discovered the glucose transporter GLUT4
 David James (cricketer, born 1921) (1921–2002), Welsh cricketer
 David James (footballer, born 1917) (1917–1981), Welsh forward
 David James (footballer, born 1942), Scottish forward
 David James (footballer, born 1970), English goalkeeper
 David James (politician, born 1843) (1843–1921), member of the Wisconsin State Senate
 David James (politician, born 1919) (1919–1986), British politician and member of the Conservative Party
 David James, Baron James of Blackheath (born 1937), British corporate trouble-shooter, former chairman of the Millennium Dome, and author of the Conservative Party's James Report
 David James (rugby, born 1866) (1866–1929), Welsh international rugby player
 David James (rugby, born 1906) (1906–1981), Welsh rugby union and professional rugby league footballer
 David James (rugby, born 1985) (born 1985), Welsh rugby league player
 Deborah Lee James (born 1958), United States Secretary of the Air Force
 Deborah James (disambiguation)
 Deborah James (activist), American activist
 Deborah James (anthropologist), South African anthropologist and academic
 Dennis James (1917–1997), American actor and game show host
 Dennis James (musician), American musician prominent in the revival of silent films
 Dennis James (bodybuilder) (born 1969), African-American bodybuilder
 Derwin James (born 1996), American football player
Devin James Stone, American lawyer and YouTuber
 Diane James (born 1959), Ukip MEP
 Dick James (1920–1986), music publisher
 Dick James (American football) (1934–2000), American footballer
 Dominic James (born 1986), American basketball player
 Don and Donald James (disambiguation), multiple people
 Don James (American football) (1932–2013), American college football head coach
 Don James (video games), Nintendo executive
 Donald James (surfer) (died 1996), American pre-WWII surfer
 Donald James (1931–2008), English novelist and television writer
 Donald Chris James (born 1962), American baseball player
 Dorothy James (1901–1982), American composer
 Doug James (born 1962), American footballer and broadcaster
 Doug James (musician) (born 1953), American musician
 Duncan Airlie James (born 1961), Scottish kickboxer and actor
 Duncan James (born 1978), British singer (Blue)
 Duncan James (Australian singer) (fl. 2003–04), Australian singer

E
 E. L. James (born 1963), British author (Fifty Shades of Grey)
 E. O. James (1888–1972), anthropologist in the field of comparative religion
 Ed, Eddie and Eddy James (disambiguation), multiple people
 Ed James (writer) (1908–1995), American writer and creator of the U.S. sitcom Father Knows Best
 Ed James (disc jockey) (born 1976), radio DJ
 Eddie James (Canadian football) (1907–1958), Canadian football running back
 Eddie James (born 1961), American murderer
 Eddy James (1874–1937), Australian rules footballer
 Edgerrin James (born 1978), American football player
 Edison James (born 1943), Prime Minister of Dominica
 Edmond James (1874–1952), British colonial administrator
 Edward James (disambiguation), multiple people
 Edward James (martyr) (c. 1557–1588), English Catholic priest and martyr
 Edward James (clergyman) (1569–1610?), Welsh clergyman and translator
 Edward James (judge) (1757–1841), judge and politician in Nova Scotia
 Edward James (barrister) (1807–1867), English barrister
 Edward James (Nova Scotia politician) (1825–1909), politician in Nova Scotia, Canada
 Edward Holton James (1873–1954), American socialist
 Edward James (cricketer) (1896–1975), Welsh cricketer
 Edward James (1907–1984), British poet and art patron
 Edward James (historian) (born 1947), Professor of medieval history at University College Dublin
 Edwin James (scientist) (1797–1861), American botanist, geographer, geologist and explorer
 Edwin James (lawyer) (c. 1812–1882), English lawyer, Member of Parliament and would-be actor
 Edwin Leland James (1890–1951), American newspaper editor
 Eleanor James (born 1986), English actress
 Elinor James (1644–1719), British printer and writer
 Elmore James (1918–1963), American blues singer, songwriter and musician
 Emrys James (1928–1989), Welsh actor
 Eric James (disambiguation), multiple people
 Eric James (cricketer, 1881–1948), Australian cricketer
 Eric James, Baron James of Rusholme (1909–1992), English peer and academic
 Eric James (cricketer, 1923–1999), Australian cricketer
 Eric James (clergyman) (1925–2012), British Anglican clergyman
 Erica James (born 1960), British novelist
 Etta James (1938–2012), American R&B and gospel singer
 Eugene James (1913–1933), American jockey
 Evan James (disambiguation), multiple people
 Evan James (poet) (1809–1878), composer of the Welsh national anthem
 Evan James (civil servant) (1846–1923), Indian Civil Service
 Evan James (rugby) (1869–1901), Welsh rugby international
 Evan James (cricketer) (1918–1989), Welsh cricketer
 Evan James (soccer) (born 1990), Canadian soccer player

F
 Faruq Mahfuz Anam (born 1964), Bangladeshi singer, known as James (musician)
 Florence James (1902–1993), Australian author and literary agent
 Fob James (born 1934), American politician; 48th Governor of Alabama
 Frances James (soprano) (1903–1988), Canadian soprano
 Frances James (ecologist) (born 1930), American ecologist
 Francesca James (born 1949), American actress
 Francis James (congressman) (1799–1886), U.S. Representative from Pennsylvania
 Francis James (missionary) (1851–1900), British Christian missionary in China
 Francis James (1918–1992), Australian publisher
 Frank James (disambiguation), multiple people
 Frank James (MP) (1821–1924), British politician
 Frank James (1843–1915), American outlaw
 Frank Linsly James (1851–1890), English explorer
 Frank Cyril James (1903–1973), Canadian academic and principal of McGill University
 Frank B. James (1912–2004), U.S. Air Force general
 Frank A. James, III, American historian
 Fred James (disambiguation), multiple people
 Freddie James (born 1937), American football coach
 Frederic James (1915–1985), American artist
 Frederick James (artist) (1845–1907), American artist
 Frederick Seton James, (1870–1934), British colonial administrator
 Frederick Alexander James (1884–1957), Australian merchant and litigant

G
 Gareth James (born 1984), English cricketer
 Gary James (born 1960), English drummer
 Garry James (born 1963), American footballer
 Gee Gee James (1902 or 1903–1971), American actress
 Gene James (1925–1997), American professional basketball player
 George James (disambiguation) 
 George James (soldier) (1760–1811), colonel of the Royal Northumberland Fusiliers
 George Payne Rainsford James (1799–1860), novelist and historical writer
 George Wharton James (1858–1923), prolific popular lecturer and journalist
 George James (footballer) (1899–1976), English footballer
 George K. James (1905–1994), American college sports coach
 George James (musician) (1906–1995), American jazz saxophonist
 George James (writer) (died c. 1954), Guyanese writer
 George James, Jr., former head college football coach for the Kentucky State University Thorobreds
 Gerald James (1917–2006), British actor
 Geraldine James (born 1950), English actress
 Gerard Luz James (born 1953), United States Virgin Islander politician, funeral director and businessman
 Gérard James, American set decorator
 Gerry James (born 1934), Canadian football, and ice hockey player
 Gill James (born 1934), Australian politician
 Glenicia James (born 1974), West Indian cricketer
 Glyn James, Welsh footballer
 Gordon James (actor) (1878–1949) English actor
 Gordon C. James, American political consultant
 Graham James (disambiguation)
 Graham James (bishop) (born 1951), British Bishop of Norwich
 Graham James (ice hockey) (born 1954), former Canadian ice hockey coach and convicted sex offender
 Greg James (disambiguation)
 Greg James, born 1985, British broadcaster, author and podcaster
 Greg James (judge), born 1944, Supreme Court judge

H
 H. Evan James (fl. 1908–1920), British Olympic fencer
 Hannah Packard James (1835 – 1903), American library pioneer
 Harold and Harry James (disambiguation), multiple people
 Harold James (archer)
 Harold James (historian) (born 1956)
 Harold James (Pennsylvania politician), State Representative
 Harry James (Australian rules footballer) (1877–1940)
 Harry James (American football) (1881–1947)
 Harry James (1916–1983), American musician
 Helen F. James (born 1956), American paleornithologist
 Helen G. James, American equality activist
 Henry James (disambiguation), multiple people
 Henry James (British Army officer) (1803–1877), director-general of the Ordnance Survey
 Henry James, Sr. (1811–1882), American theologian
 Henry James, 1st Baron James of Hereford (1828–1911), English lawyer and statesman
 Henry James (1843–1916), American author and critic
 Henry Evan Murchison James (1846–1923), British officer in the Indian Civil Service, explorer and writer
 Henry James (priest) (1864–1949), Dean of Bangor Cathedral, 1934–1940
 Henry James (biographer) (1879–1947), winner of the 1931 Pulitzer Prize for Biography or Autobiography
 Henry James (basketball) (born 1965), American basketball player
 Hilary James, British musician
 Hilda James (1904–1982), British Olympic swimmer
 Horace James (born 1984), Jamaican footballer
 Hugh James (1890–1967), Australian Rules footballer from Victoria

I
 Iain James, English singer/songwriter
 Ian James (athlete) (born 1963), Canadian Olympic long jumper
 Ifor James (1931–2004), British musician and teacher
 Ivor James (1882–1963), British cellist

J
 Jack James (Australian rules footballer) (1892–1977), played for St Kilda and Richmond in Victoria
 Jack James (rocket engineer) (1920–2001), American who worked on NASA's Mariner program
 Jackie James, Scottish musician
 James James (1833–1902), Welsh musician (composer of 'Land of my Fathers')
 Jamie James (born 1953), Canadian guitarist and singer/songwriter
 Jason James (disambiguation), multiple people
 Jason James (musician) (born 1981), Welsh musician
 Jason James (basketball), American college basketball coach
 Jay James (Bullet for My Valentine) (born 1981), Welsh musician
 Jeff James (baseball) (1941–2006), American baseball player
 Jeff James (musician) (born 1988), American singer and songwriter
 Jeffrey James, Australian news anchor
 Jennifer James (born 1977), English actress
 Jeremy James (sculptor) (born 1964), British sculptor
 Jeremy James (singer/songwriter) (born 1978), American musician
 Jesse James (disambiguation)
 Jesse James (1847–1882), American outlaw, member of the James-Younger Gang
 Jesse E. James (1875–1951), only surviving son of American outlaw Jesse James
 Jesse James (Texas Treasurer) (1904–1977), Texas State Treasurer
 Jesse James (television personality) (born 1969), custom vehicle maker and American television personality
 Jesse James (actor) (born 1989), American actor
 Jesse James (tight end) (born 1994), American football player
 Jesse James (songwriter), writer of the 1968 hit instrumental "The Horse"
 Jewell James (born 1953), Lummi master wood carver, activist
 Jill James, American biochemist
 Jim James (born 1978), American musician
 Joe James (disambiguation)
 Joe James (racing driver) (1925–1952), American racecar driver
 Joe James (American football), head football coach for the Howard Payne University Yellow Jackets
 Joe James (soccer) (born 1961), U.S. soccer defender
John James (disambiguation):
John James (architect) (1673–1746), English architect
John James (actor) (born 1956), American actor
John James (Australian rules footballer) (1934–2010), Australian Rules footballer
John E. James (born 1981), American businessman
Jonathan James (1983–2008), American cybercriminal
Joni James (1930–2022), American singer
 Joseph James and Joseph James, Jr., (born c. 1790 and 1820 respectively), Native American interpreters
Joshua James (disambiguation), multiple people
Josiah-Jordan James (born 2000), American basketball player
Justin James (disambiguation), multiple people

K
 Kamara James (1984–2014), American Olympic fencer
 Kasey James (born 1982), American wrestler
 Kelly James (1958–2006), American mountain climber
 Kendall James (born 1991), American football player
 Ken, Kenneth and Kenny James (disambiguation), multiple people
 Ken James (cricketer) (1904–1976), former New Zealand Test cricketer
 Ken James (politician) (1934–2014), former Canadian Member of Parliament
 Ken James (Australian actor) (born 1948)
 Kenneth Tyler James, musician
 Kenny James (American football) (born 1984)
 Kevin James (disambiguation), multiple people
 Kevin James (magician) (born 1962), French-born American magician
 Kevin James (broadcaster) (born 1963), conservative radio host and political commentator
 Kevin James (born 1965), American actor and comedian
 Kevin James (Scottish footballer) (born 1975), footballer for Ayr United
 Kevin James (terrorist) (born c.1976), American who pleaded guilty to planning terrorist attacks in California
 Kevin James (English footballer) (born 1980), footballer for Dulwich Hamlet
 Kirani James (born 1992), Grenadian sprinter

L
 L. Dean James (1947–2018), American writer
 Larry James (disambiguation), multiple people
 Larry James (1947–2008) American Olympic sprinter
 Larry M. James (born 1950), President and CEO of CitySquare
 Larry D. James, Lt. General in the United States Air Force
 Larry C. James, former chief psychologist at Guantanamo, and author of Fixing Hell
 Laura James (nurse) (1880–1969), New Zealand nurse in World War I
 Laura James (born 1990), American model
 LeBron James (born 1984), American basketball player
 Lee James (politician) (born 1948), member of the Pennsylvania House of Representatives
 Lee James (1953–2023) American weightlifter
 Lee S. James (born 1973), English golfer
 Lee James (BBC) (fl. 2009), British sports broadcaster
 Leela James (born 1983), American singer
 Leighton James (born 1953), Welsh footballer
 Lennie James (born 1965), English actor
 Leon James (born 2001), Thai footballer
 Les James (1890–1917), Australian rules footballer
 Letitia James (born 1958), American lawyer, activist, and politician in Brooklyn
 Lily James (born 1989), English actress
 Lionel James (1962–2022), American football player
 Linda James (born 1951), British–born New Zealand artist
 Liz James, British art historian
 Louisa James (born 1979), English journalist and newsreader
 Luke James (disambiguation), multiple people
 Luke James (footballer) (born 1994), midfielder for Peterborough United F.C.
 Luke James (singer) American R&B singer
 Lulu James (born c. 1992), British electronic and soul singer

M
 Mabel Moir James (1917–2010), Dominican politician
 Margaret Calkin James, fashion designer
 Margot James (born 1957), British politician
 Maria James (1793–1868), Welsh-born American poet
 Marion James (1934–2015), American blues singer and songwriter
 Mark James (disambiguation), multiple people
 Mark James (British cleric) (1845-1898), British-Bermudan priest 
 Mark James (songwriter) (born 1940), American songwriter
 Mark James (golfer) (born 1953), English golfer
 Mark Andrew James, American conductor and oboist
 Martin James (disambiguation), multiple people
 Martin S. James (1920–2011), English-American art historian
 Martin James (cricketer) (born 1963), English cricketer
 Martin James (footballer) (born 1971), English professional football player
 Marty James, American singer/songwriter
 Marvin James (born 1989), Swiss snowboarder
 Mary James (educator), Associate Director of Research at the University of Cambridge
 Mathew, Matt, Matthew and Matty James (disambiguation), multiple people
 Mathew James (umpire) (born 1974), Australian rules football umpire
 Matt James (game designer) (born 1981), American game designer
 Matt James (rugby league) (born 1987), British rugby league player
 Matt James (TV presenter), British host of shows such as The City Gardener
 Matthew C. James 19th century Marine architect, poet and songwriter
 Matthew James (politician) (born 1955), American politician from Virginia
 Matthew James (actor), American actor
 Matty James (Matthew Lee James, born 1991), English footballer for Leicester City
 Max James (born 1951), Australian rules footballer from South Australia
 Mel James, Welsh rugby union and rugby league footballer
 Melville James (1877–1957), Australian Anglican bishop
 Merlin James (born 1960), British artist
 M. E. Clifton James (1898–1963), British actor, impersonator of Field Marshal Bernard Montgomery
 Michael, Mickie and Mike James (disambiguation), multiple people
 Michael James (singer), British singer and songwriter
 Michael James (politician), Canadian politician of the early 20th century
 Michael James (Australian footballer) (born 1971), Australian rules footballer
 Michael James (producer), American record producer, guitarist, and mixing engineer
 Michael James (quilt artist) (born 1949), American artist
 Mickie James (born 1979), American professional wrestler
 Mike James (baseball) (born 1967), American baseball player
 Mike James (rugby union) (born 1973), Canadian rugby union player
 Mike James (basketball, born 1975), American basketball player
 Mike James (basketball, born 1990), American basketball player
 Mike James (American football) (born 1991)
 Miles James (1829–1871), American soldier and Medal of Honour recipient
 Miss James (1830–1910) English philanthropist
 Montague Rhodes James (1862–1936), British mediaeval scholar and writer
 Morgan James (born 1981), American singer/songwriter and actress

N
 Naomi James (born 1949), New Zealand sailor
 Natalie James, married name of Natalie Caine (1909–2008), English oboist
 Nate James (born 1977), British singer/songwriter
 Nate James (basketball) (born 1977), American basketball player
 Neil James (c. 1961–2014), English rugby league footballer
 Nick James (disambiguation)
 Nicky James (1943–2007), British musician and songwriter
 Norman James (disambiguation), multiple people
 Norman L. James (1840–1918), American politician
 Norman B. James (1872–1963), Canadian politician
 Norman James (footballer) (1908–1985), English footballer
 Norman James (broadcaster) Canadian sports broadcaster

O
 Oliver James (disambiguation)
 Oliver James (psychologist) (born 1953), psychologist, journalist, author and television presenter
 Oliver James (entertainer) (born 1980), English musician, singer, songwriter and actor
 Oliver James (footballer) (born 1987), English professional footballer
 Oliver James (cricketer) (born 1990), Welsh cricketer

P
P. D. James (1920–2014), British crime writer
Paul James (disambiguation)
Percy James (1917–1993), Welsh footballer
Peter James (historian), British historian
Peter James (writer) (born 1948), British writer
Peter Wilfred James (1930–2014), British botanist
Pilli Alfred James (1931–1983), Indian academic
 Polly James - multiple people
Polly James (born 1941), British actress
Polly James (broadcaster) (fl. 2010 -), British broadcaster
Polly James (screenwriter) (fl. 1940's - 1950's), American screenwriter
Philip Frederick Wright James (17 May 1890 – 1 November 1975) an American composer, conductor and music educator.
Philip Seaforth James (28 May 1914 – 5 May 2001) a barrister, academic, author and soldier.
Philip J. K. James (born 30 June 1978) is a British entrepreneur, adventurer and CEO of Penrose Hill
Phil Nyokai James (born 1954) is a teacher, performer and avant-garde composer

R
Raji James (born 1970), British actor
Ralph Duncan James (1909–1979), English and Canadian mathematician
Reginald W. James (1891–1964), English and South African naturalist and physicist
Reece James (disambiguation)
Reece James (footballer, born 1993), English footballer
Reece James (footballer, born 1999), English footballer
Richard James (disambiguation):
Richard James (scholar) (1592–1638), English scholar and librarian
Richard James (musician), British musician
Richard D. James (born 1971), British musician known as Aphex Twin
Richard D. James (scientist) (born 1952), American scientist
Richard T. James (1914–1974), American co-inventor of the Slinky
Richie James (born 1995), American football player
Rick James (1948–2004), African-American funk and soul musician
 Rob, Robbie and Robert James (disambiguation)
 Rob James (singer) (born 1977), Canadian pop singer
 Rob James (guitarist), member of The Clarks
 Robbie James (1957–1998), Welsh soccer player
 Robert James (physician) (1703–1776), English physician
 Robert S. James (1818–1850), father of the American outlaw Jesse James
 Robert James (headmaster) (1905–1982), headmaster of St Paul's School and of Harrow School
 Robert James (actor) (1924–2004), Scottish actor
 Robert Rhodes James (1933–1999), British historian and Conservative Member of Parliament
 Robert G. James (born 1946), United States District Court judge
 Robert James (defensive back) (born 1947), played in the National Football League, 1969–1974
 Robert James (linebacker) (born 1983), drafted by the Atlanta Falcons, 2008

S
Sally James (disambiguation)
Scottie James (born 1996), American basketball player for the Hapoel Haifa of the Israeli Basketball Premier League
Sharpe James (born 1936), American politician
Sebastian James (born 1966), British businessman and son of Christopher James, 5th Baron Northbourne
Shawn James (born 1983), Guyanese-American basketball player
Sid James (1913–1976), South African born British actor and comedian
Skip James (1902–1969), American blues singer and guitarist
Sonny James (1928–2016), American country singer
S.P. (Sydney Price) James (1870–1946), British physician and parasitologist
Steve James (disambiguation):
Steve James (blues musician) (born 1950), American folk blues musician
Steve James (cricketer) (born 1967), English cricketer
Steve James (snooker player) (born 1961), English snooker player
Steve James (actor) (1952–1993), American actor
Steve James (footballer) (born 1949), English soccer player
Steve James (born 1965), American professional wrestler better known as Steve Armstrong

T
 T. G. H. James (1923–2009), British Egyptologist, known as Harry James
Teresa James (1914–2008), American aviator 
Tessa James (born 1991), Australian actress
Tommy James (born 1947), American musician
Tony James (born 1958), British musician

V
 Val James (born 1957), American ice hockey player
 Victor James (1897–1984), Australian Unitarian minister and pacifist

W
Walter James (1863–1943), Premier of Western Australia from 1902 to 1904 and supporter of the federation movement
Sir Walter James, 1st Baronet (1759–1829), British Baronet and last warden of the Royal Mint
Walter James, 1st Baron Northbourne (1816–1893), British Member of Parliament
Walter James, 2nd Baron Northbourne (1846–1923), British Peer and Liberal politician
Walter James, 4th Baron Northbourne (1896–1982), British olympic rower and agriculturist
Wendy James (born 1966), British singer
William James (disambiguation):
William James (1842–1910), American philosopher
William James (naval commander) (1720–1783), British naval commander
W. Frank James (1873–1945), US Congressman
William H. James (1831–1920), second governor of Nebraska

Y
 Yolande James (born 1977), Canadian politician

Fictional characters
 Corey James, a character in the television series All American
 Dillon James, a character in the television series All American
 Grace James, a character in the television series All American
 Jeremy James, a character in the novel Adventures with Jeremy James
 Kenny James (My Name is Earl), a character on My Name is Earl
 Julie James, a character on I Know What You Did Last Summer
 Pamela James, a character on Martin
 Spencer James, a character in the television series All American

Other
 Angela James Bowl, Canadian ice hockey trophy
"Bobby James", song by N*E*R*D
 The ClementJames Centre, a British charity based in London
 Colin James (album), the 1988 debut album from Canadian musician Colin James
 Ellen James Society, American rock band
 Isaac James, American rock band
 HMS Mary James, two ships of the Royal Navy have borne the name Mary James

See also
James (disambiguation)
Jameson (disambiguation)
Jamison (disambiguation)

References

Patronymic surnames
English-language surnames
Surnames from given names